1961 Bogoroditsk Il-18 incident is an air incident in the USSR that happened on Thursday June 22, 1961, near the town of Bogoroditsk, Tula Oblast, involving Il-18B aircraft of the Aeroflot company. The incident caused no deaths.

Il-18B bearing number 75672 (factory 189000901 and serial 009-01) was constructed by the factory of MMZ "Banner Of Labor" in 1959 and was handed over to General Directorate of Civil Air Fleet, which on April 19 transferred it to Vnukovo Air Squadron of the Moscow Department of Transport Aviation of the Civil Air Fleet. The passenger capacity of the airliner was of 80 seats. On April 24 it made its first flight from Moscow Domodedovo to Alma-Ata.

The plane was on a flight from Moscow to Sochi. It was driven by crew consisting of the commander B. E. Gratsianov, 2nd pilot Y. N. Belkin, sturman B. A. Andreev, flight mechanic G. D. Postribailo, radio operator G. Y. Margulis. The pilots had little experience in piloting Il-18: Gratsianov was making his 2nd flight as commander, Belkin was making his 1st flight after re-training. The stewardesses were V. E. Zhuravleva, N. V, Pokhitonova and V. Y. Smirnova. 89 passengers were on board. After taking off Vnukovo Airport the plane ascended to 6100 meters.

Flying over Tula oblast, a fire alarm went off for the engine #3. The crew activated the fire extinguishing system, but it didn't work. At the time, flight instructions contained no descriptions of this kind of situation. The nearest airfield was a military Efremov-3 (9 km south-east from Efremov town), that was reachable in several minutes. But the crew decided they were too short of time, so they started trying to make a forced landing on fields below them using emergency descent. Before starting, they radioed: "Landing on field. Plane on fire. End of link", and the link was broken.

While on fire, Il-18 leveled with the ground, the crew turned off 3 remaining engines. With gear up, the plane belly landed atop of an oat field in Bogoroditskiy rayon of Tula oblast, slipped 300 meters and stopped. The fire was extinguished quickly; nobody of the 97 people on board died. The cause of the fire was destruction of the generator which debris damaged the oil pipeline. The oil spilled and caused fire. The fire extinguishing system didn't activate because electric terminals of its circuit scheme were mixed up.

For the inventiveness and courage, all of the crew members were awarded in Moscow Kremlin: the commander Boris Evgenievich Gratsianov — Order of the Red Banner of Labour; 2nd pilot Yuri Nikolaevich Belkin — Order of Red Star; sturman Boris Anatolievich Andreev  — Order of Red Star; flight mechanic Georgiy Dmitrievich Postribailo — Order of Red Star; radio operator Grigoriy Yakovlevich Margulis — Order of the Badge of Honor; stewardesses Valentina Efimovna Zhuravleva, Nataliya Vasilyevna Pokhitonova and Valentina Yurievna Smirnova — Medal "For Distinguished Labour". The damaged plane was repaired and transferred as a model to Riga Civil Aviation Engineers Institute.

See also 
 List of accidents and incidents involving the Ilyushin Il-18
 Aeroflot accidents and incidents in the 1960s

Sources 
 https://aviation-safety.net/database/record.php?id=19610622-0
  http://russianplanes.net/reginfo/34173
  http://www.airdisaster.ru/database.php?id=219

Aeroflot
Accidents and incidents involving the Ilyushin Il-18
Airliner accidents and incidents caused by engine failure
Airliner accidents and incidents involving belly landings